Acrapex exanimis is a moth of the family Noctuidae. It was first described by Edward Meyrick in 1899. It is endemic to the Hawaiian islands of Oahu and Hawaii.

The wingspan is about 25 mm.

The larvae feed on Pannicum kaalense and Panicum torridum. They bore the stems of their host plant. The larvae apparently migrate from one stem to another, for in many bored stems with "dead hearts" not enough eating had been done to suffice for the growth of a larva. Full-grown larvae are whitish without markings, with black spiracles and a uniform yellowish or stramineous (straw colored) head. The eyes are black and the thoracic shield is concolorous with the head but paler.

Pupation takes place in a slight cocoon. There is a period of a week or more after the larva finishes eating before pupation takes place. About two weeks were occupied in the pupal stage. The pupa is about 11 mm long, rather slender and quite uniformly pale brown.

External links

Xyleninae
Endemic moths of Hawaii